Eastern Navarrese (Ekialdeko nafar euskalkia in Basque) is an extinct Basque dialect spoken in Navarre, Spain. It included two subdialects: Salazarese and Roncalais.

The name of this dialect was proposed by the foremost living Basque dialectologist, Koldo Zuazo, in a new classification of Basque dialects published in 2004. Later on, when the last speakers (of the Salazarese subdialect) died at the beginning of the 21st century, Zuazo retired Eastern Navarrese from the list of living dialects.

Comparison

Notes and references

External links 
  Map of Basque dialects by Koldo Zuazo

Basque dialects
Navarre culture
Languages extinct in the 1990s